"New Love in Town" is a hard rock ballad, that was the second single released from the Swedish heavy metal band Europe's eighth studio album, Last Look at Eden. The single was released as a digital download on 3 September 2009. It was written about Joey Tempest's son's birth.

In August 2009, Europe went to Gothenburg to work with director Patric Ullaeus on the video for the single. The video was premiered on Europe's MySpace page on 5 September 2009.

Track listing

UK maxi single
 "New Love in Town" (Joey Tempest, Mic Michaeli, Andreas Carlsson, Europe) – 3:33
 "The Beast" (Joey Tempest, John Levén, Europe) – 3:23
 "Last Look at Eden" [live] (Joey Tempest, Andreas Carlsson, Europe) – 4:49

Personnel
Joey Tempest – vocals
John Norum – guitars
John Levén – bass
Mic Michaeli – keyboards
Ian Haugland – drums
Tobias Lindell – producer
Dimitrios Dimitriadis – art direction

Chart positions

References

2009 singles
Europe (band) songs
Songs written by Joey Tempest
Songs written by Andreas Carlsson
Hard rock ballads
2009 songs